Xing Jianing (born 08 December 2001) is a Chinese ice dancer. Along with partner Chen Xizi, he is the 2022 Chinese champion.

Programs

Competitive highlights 
With Chen

Detailed results
Small medals for short program and free skating are awarded only at ISU Championships. At team events, medals are awarded for team results only. ISU personal bests are highlighted in bold.

Senior level

References

2001 births
Chinese male ice dancers
Living people
21st-century Chinese people